Taft Archeological Site No. 029-5411 is a historic archaeological site located at Lorton, Fairfax County, Virginia.  The site includes a multi-component, stratified,
upland, prehistoric and possibly proto-historic (Dogue), American Indian camp covering a 50x80-meter area and dating to between ca. 2000 B.C. (based on Savannah River point) and A.D. 1560. The site was excavated in three stages in May through August 1987. The site is located in Mason Neck State Park.

It was listed on the National Register of Historic Places in 2004.

References

Archaeological sites on the National Register of Historic Places in Virginia
National Register of Historic Places in Fairfax County, Virginia